Southern Wayne High School is a high school for grades 9–12, located in Dudley near Goldsboro, North Carolina, USA.

It is part of the Wayne County School System. Southern Wayne currently employs 135 staff members for over 1,000 students.

Notable alumni
 Allen Battle, former MLB player
 Cecil Exum, former pro basketball player and 1982 NCAA basketball champion with the North Carolina Tarheels
 Leora "Sam" Jones, member of three U.S. Olympic women's handball teams (1984, 1988, 1992)
 Charles Kornegay, former professional basketball player
 Mike Olliver, professional basketball player
Tim Pratt, author and editor
 Greg Warren, former NFL longsnapper and 2x Super Bowl champion with the Pittsburgh Steelers

References

External links
 Southern Wayne High Official Website

Public high schools in North Carolina
Schools in Wayne County, North Carolina